is a Japanese professional golfer currently playing on the Japan Golf Tour.

Career
Maruyama was born in Chiba Prefecture and played his first full season on the Japan Golf Tour in 2001. He picked up his first win on Tour in 2005 at the Fujisankei Classic. His best year on Tour so far was in 2005, with a win, eight top-10s, and 22 of 27 cuts made. He also has three victories on the Japan Challenge Tour at the 2001 PGA Cup Challenge, the 2016 Seven Dreamers Challenge and the 2016 Taiheiyo Club Challenge Tournament.

In 2009, Maruyama won the Asia-Pacific Panasonic Open, a tournament that brings together players from the Japanese and Asian golf tours. Maruyama played on the PGA Tour in 2006 and 2007 after finishing T7 at the 2005 qualifying school. His best finish was T3 at the 2006 The International.

Professional wins (7)

Japan Golf Tour wins (3)

*Note: The 2013 Bridgestone Open was shortened to 54 holes due to weather.
1Co-sanctioned by the Asian Tour

Japan Golf Tour playoff record (0–2)

Asian Tour wins (2)

1Co-sanctioned by the Japan Golf Tour

Japan Challenge Tour wins (3)

Results in major championships

CUT = missed the halfway cut
Note: Maruyama only played in The Open Championship.

Results in The Players Championship

WD = withdrew

Results in World Golf Championships

"T" = Tied

See also
2005 PGA Tour Qualifying School graduates

External links

Japanese male golfers
Japan Golf Tour golfers
PGA Tour golfers
Sportspeople from Chiba Prefecture
1971 births
Living people